Felix Holzmann (born 8 July 1921 – 13 September 2002) was a popular Czech comedian and screenwriter known for his unique wordplay humor, way of speech, and look.

Personal life
Holzmann came from a Bohemian German family originally from Teplice, which soon moved to Litoměřice. As a German citizen of the Sudetenland during the Second World War, he served in Wehrmacht, at the naval artillery in Denmark. At the end of the war, he was taken prisoner by the Soviets and spent one year in the gulag. He never talked about his war experience and they were revealed not until his death. 
 
He graduated from a business school in Aussig, but later he became a professional comedian, perfectly fluent both in Czech and in German.

Holzmann was married twice, first to Eva Vorlíčková, a war widow, whose daughter Eva he adopted. Although they lived together since 1946 and had another daughter Irena, they remained unmarried for two decades, so Eva would have not lost her widow's pension, which was an essential income for the family. They married as late as in 1968, when Holzmann had already broken through as a comedian. However, as he became popular and started touring extensively, his wife began to feel lonely and useless, sank into depression and in 1970 she committed suicide. Holzmann was devastated and felt responsible for the rest of his life.

He then met and eventually married Barbara Greif, a 25 years him younger German actress and singer, with whom he then also toured and performed. The couple moved to the former East Germany, but he kept returning to perform and record in Czechoslovakia, where he remained very popular.

He died aged 81 in his home Chemnitz.

Style
Holzmann's humor consisted in precisely built dialogues full of improperly literal taking of words and phrases, and other wordplay, so most of it is virtually untranslatable. Its essentially linguistic and apolitical nature also meant that it was largely acceptable for the Czechoslovakian communist censorship, and also that it appealed broad audience – just to know the language was necessary.

In his scenes, he wore typical props consisting of a small hat (so-called "tralaláček"), a neckerchief, and large round horn-rimmed glasses. He also developed a distinctive accent, lying in interrogative broaching of word-endings, even in inappropriate places of speech.

His sketches were exceptionally monologues, but typically dialogues, where he usually talked to some straight man struggling with his extreme slow-wittedness. His most favourite partner was František Budín, who, however, was not a professional artist and refused to leave his occupation as an accountant. Thus, Holzmann also cooperated with various other popular comedians, actors, and singers, like Lubomír Lipský, Iva Janžurová, Miloslav Šimek, or Karel Gott.

Filmography

1993 	Deset malých běloušků (TV film)
Documentary
2010 	Komici na jedničku 
2006 	Buďte pozdraven, pane Jouda! (TV film)
TV 
2012 	Legendy: Felix Holzmann: Včera, dnes a zítra 
2010 	Deset zastavení s mistry zábavy 
2006 	To nejlepší z televizního humoru 
2004 	Felix Holzmann: Včera, dnes a zítra 
	Řekněte mi, kdo to je 
	Tak mi tedy řekněte 
2003 	Odkud já vás znám 
	Silvestrovské taneční hodiny 
2001 	Ať se lidi mají rádi...aspoň dnes 
1999 	Co takhle dát si Gotta 
1997 	Proč bychom se nebavili, když nám Pánbůh archiv dal 
	Úsměvy 
1992 	Šance 
1990 	Šaráda 
1987 	Zajíc v pytli 
1985 	Humoriády Felixe Holzmanna 
	Kavárnička dříve narozených 
1978 	Silvestr hravý a dravý 
1973 	Zpívá Karel Gott

External links
Profile on Supraphon
Felix Holzman on Česko-Slovenská filmová databáze (Czechoslovak film databaze)
Felix Holzmann died - idnes.cz (article in Czech)

References

1921 births
2002 deaths
People from Teplice
People from Litoměřice
Czech male stage actors
Czech male television actors
20th-century Czech male actors
Czechoslovak male actors
Czechoslovak emigrants to Germany
Kriegsmarine personnel of World War II